Bernhard Auinger (21 February 1982 in Salzburg, Austria) is a race car driver. In 2003 he drove two races of the Formula 3000 season for Red Bull, having previously competed in Italian Formula Three (2002) and German Formula Three (2000–2002). He was the 2000 German Formula König champion. He currently races in Euroseries 3000.

Racing record

Complete Formula 3 Euro Series results
(key) (Races in bold indicate pole position) (Races in italics indicate fastest lap)

Complete International Formula 3000 results
(key) (Races in bold indicate pole position; races in italics indicate fastest lap.)

References 
 Driver Database - Auinger, Bernhard

1982 births
Living people
Sportspeople from Salzburg
Austrian racing drivers
Auto GP drivers
Italian Formula Three Championship drivers
German Formula Three Championship drivers
International Formula 3000 drivers
Formula 3 Euro Series drivers
ADAC GT Masters drivers

Opel Team BSR drivers
RSM Marko drivers
Euronova Racing drivers